Lionella Pyryeva (15 March 1938 in Odesa, Ukraine; birth name Skirda and present name Strizhenova) is a retired Soviet actress. She is known for her roles in The Brothers Karamazov (1969), in the role of Grushenka, Wind of Freedom (1961) and The Light of a Distant Star (1964). In 1991, she was awarded the Honored Artist of the RSFSR award.

She initially married the famous Soviet film director and screenwriter Ivan Pyryev. He was more than 36 years her senior. After Pyerev had died, she married in 1976 Oleg Strizhenov, a film and stage actor like her.

References

Living people
1938 births
Honored Artists of the RSFSR
Soviet film actresses
Soviet stage actresses